CPMA may refer to:

Challenge ProMode Arena, a modification for the Quake III: Arena PC video game
Consumer Protection and Markets Authority (United Kingdom), a proposed UK regulatory body
 Certified Medical Auditing though AAPC
 Certified Project Management Analyst (CPMA) certification from IQN
 Certified Project Management Associate